Commerce de Marseille was a  of the French Navy.  She was funded by a don des vaisseaux  donation from Marseille.

She was renamed Lys in July 1786 and Tricolore in October 1792. She was one of the ships in Toulon when the city was surrendered to a British force under Admiral Lord Hood in August 1793. Tricolore was subsequently burned by the British in their withdrawal from the port in December that year.

See also
 List of ships of the line of France

References

1785 ships
Ships of the line of the French Navy
Téméraire-class ships of the line
Ships built in France
Maritime incidents in 1793
Don des vaisseaux